Manoba subfuscataria is a moth in the family Nolidae. It was described by Hiroshi Inoue in 1998. It is found in Nepal and Thailand.

References

Moths described in 1998
Nolinae